Lemyra toxopei is a moth of the family Erebidae. It was described by Roepke in 1946. It is found on Sulawesi.

References

 

toxopei
Moths described in 1946